Dildar Hussain (born 1957) is a Pakistani percussionist and tabla player. He is known for being the left handed tabla player for late Nusrat Fateh Ali Khan, a renowned Qawwali singer. Dildar Hussain played tabla for him in his qawwali-singing group until Nusrat Fateh Ali Khan died in 1997. Dildar Hussain belongs to the Punjab gharana of tabla-playing music artists. He is a shagird of Ustad Allah Rakha. 
Dildar Hussain plays the tabla left-handed

Career
He was born in Kasur, Punjab, Pakistan in 1957. Dildar Hussain's father was also a tabla-player. Dildar Hussain initially learned tabla-playing from Ustad Alla Rakha, a renowned veteran tabla-player of Punjab gharana in Pakistan. His first performance was in India in 1969. Then he joined Nusrat Fateh Ali Khan's original group back in 1971, at the age of 14, and stayed with that group for 30 years. While Dildar Hussain played tabla with Nusrat Fateh Ali Khan's group, his training in tabla-playing continued with Ustad Nusrat.
Now, after Nusrat Fateh Ali Khan's death, Ustad Dildar Hussain carries the tradition on with his sons. His eldest son Abrar  and his youngest son Israr are following the family tradition, and are, like their father, working as tabla players.

Aminah Chishti, a female US national approached Dildar Hussain sometimes after 2001, to ask him to teach her the art of tabla-playing. Her interest towards qawwali and Sufism began when she was given a Nusrat Fateh Ali Khan music cassette around 2001. Inspired by the qawwali music, Jessica Ripper converted to Islam and changed her name to Aminah Chishti. She and her qawwali group have performed at a number of Sufi shrines and festivals in Pakistan since 2001.

Ustad Dildar Hussain does not play the traditional tabla that can be seen in Hindustani classical music but instead plays a combination of "jori" as the treble, and "dhamma" as the bass to create a deeper, warmer sound than the modern tabla set creates. This style created with the intention to carry sound acoustically.

References

External links

Dildar Hussain tabla session on YouTube

1957 births
Living people
Musicians from Faisalabad
Tabla players
Tabla gharanas
Instrumental gharanas
Pakistani percussionists
Nusrat Fateh Ali Khan